Jordan Elliott (born November 23, 1997) is an American football defensive tackle for the Cleveland Browns of the National Football League (NFL). He played college football at Missouri and was drafted by the Browns in the third round of the 2020 NFL Draft.

Early years
Elliott attended Westside High School in Houston, Texas. He played in the 2016 U.S. Army All-American Bowl. He committed to the University of Texas at Austin to play college football.

College career
Elliott attended Texas for one season. He played in six games and recorded eight tackles. Prior to the 2017 season, he transferred to the University of Missouri. After sitting out 2017 due to transfer rules, Elliott played the next two years, recording 68 tackles and 5.5 sacks. After the 2019 season, he entered the 2020 NFL Draft.

Professional career

Elliott was drafted by the Cleveland Browns in the third round with the 88th overall pick of the 2020 NFL Draft. He signed his rookie contract with the Browns on July 2, 2020.

Career statistics

References

External links
Missouri Tigers bio

1997 births
Living people
American football defensive tackles
Cleveland Browns players
Missouri Tigers football players
People from Missouri City, Texas
Players of American football from Texas
Sportspeople from Harris County, Texas
Texas Longhorns football players